Mary Ann Meets the Gravediggers and Other Short Stories is a compilation album by Regina Spektor, released in 2006 for the UK market, where it reached #185 on the UK Albums Chart. It features songs from her three previous albums, 11:11, Songs, and Soviet Kitsch. The CD comes packaged with a bonus DVD (Region 2) featuring the short promo film "Survival Guide to Soviet Kitsch" and the music video for the song "Us". (These are the same materials found on the DVD that accompanied some US and Australian editions of Soviet Kitsch.)

The title comes from two tracks on the compilation that mention a character named Mary Ann ("Sailor Song" and "Mary Ann") and two tracks that mention gravediggers ("Consequence of Sounds" and "Pavlov’s Daughter").

The cover art was drawn by Julie Morstad and is done in the style of Edward Gorey.

Track listing
"Oedipus" (Songs)
"Love Affair" (11:11)
"Poor Little Rich Boy" (Soviet Kitsch)
"Sailor Song" (Soviet Kitsch)
"Mary Ann" (11:11)
"Prisoners" (Songs)
"Consequence of Sounds" (Songs)
"Daniel Cowman" (Songs)
"Lacrimosa" (Songs)
"Pavlov’s Daughter" (11:11)
"Chemo Limo" (Soviet Kitsch)
"Us" (Soviet Kitsch)

The cover and booklet in the CD contains art work by artist Julie Morstad.

References

2006 compilation albums
Regina Spektor albums
Transgressive Records albums